Sunnataram Forest Monastery is a Theravada Buddhist monastery in the Thai Forest Tradition. The establishment of the monastery was in July 1990. It is situated on the outer lying area of the town Bundanoon in the Southern Highlands.

Gallery

References

External links 

 Official website

Asian-Australian culture in New South Wales
Buddhist temples in Australia
Buddhism in Australia
Religious buildings and structures in New South Wales
Thai-Australian culture
Buddhist temples and monasteries of the Thai Forest Tradition
1990 establishments in Australia
20th-century Buddhist temples